Patricia Raikadroka (born 22 June 1993) is an Australian rugby league footballer who plays for the New Zealand Warriors in the NRL Women's Premiership.

Playing career
Raikadroka is a development player for the Warriors in the NRLW. She made her international debut for Fiji in 2019.

References

External links
New Zealand Warriors profile
International profile

1993 births
Living people
Australian people of Fijian descent
Australian female rugby league players
Fiji women's national rugby league team players
Rugby league centres
New Zealand Warriors (NRLW) players